Kokey is a 1997 Filipino science fiction film. The film is about an alien who had a penchant for befriending human beings. It was directed by Romy Suzara.

Plot
On their way home, Bong and Anna discover Kokey, an extraterrestrial whose spaceship explodes upon landing on earth. Without the knowledge of their parents, the children keep Kokey at home. The three soon become the best of friends with Kokey turning out to be a big help to the family and their business, attracting customers using his extraterrestrial powers. But Kokey becomes homesick, pointing to the sky in silent tears, missing his parents. He tries to contact them but with no success. Will he ever be reunited to his family? How long can the children keep Kokey a secret?

Cast
 Carlo Aquino as Bong - the brother of Anna and the kid who witnessed Kokey.
 Ani Pearl Alonso as Anna - the sister of Bong
 Mahal as Kokey - the alien from another planet
 Ricky Davao as Nanding - the father of Bong and Anna who works on the mine
 Cherry Pie Picache as Trining - the mother of Bong and Anna who is a housewife
 Paquito Diaz as Marcial - the leader of a syndicate who wants to kidnap Kokey
 Nova Villa as Mrs. Querubin - the mother of Bong's friend
 Ernie Zarate as Dr. Perez - a doctor who needs to study about Kokey.
 L.A. Lopez as Ruel
 Danny Labra as Antonio
 Eddie Nicart as Banderas
 King Gutierrez as Boy Pana

20th anniversary
In 2017, Kokey celebrated its 20th anniversary by being digitally restored and remastered by ABS-CBN Film Restoration.

See also
Kokey (TV series)
Kokey at Ako

References

1997 films
1990s Tagalog-language films
Star Cinema films
Films about extraterrestrial life
Philippine science fiction films
1997 science fiction films
Films directed by Romy Suzara